Nilotpal Basu is an Indian politician. He was a Member of Parliament, representing West Bengal in the Rajya Sabha the upper house of India's Parliament as a member of the Communist Party of India (Marxist). He runs an NGO called Grameen Sanchar Society (GRASSO) which started a Mobile PCO scheme in West Bengal with state and BSNL support. Basu got into controversy after bank loans taken by the GRASSO were not repaid.

References

Rajya Sabha members from West Bengal
Communist Party of India (Marxist) politicians from West Bengal
1956 births
Living people